Made in Oregon is a private company founded in Portland, Oregon, United States in 1975 by Portland businessman Sam Naito.  The company is a gift retailer that specializes in Oregon-made products.  It was originally owned by Norcrest China Company, an import business co-owned by Sam Naito and his brother Bill Naito, until Norcrest was reorganized as H. Naito Corporation in 1992.

The first Made in Oregon store opened in 1975 in an  space at Portland International Airport, and was one of the first retailers in what became the Oregon Market inside the airport.  The idea of offering products from one state was then a novelty; now the concept has been often copied. The chain had expanded to 11 stores by 1989 and had stores in 12 locations in 1998.

As of 2010, Made in Oregon had 9 retail locations, including two locations in Portland International Airport, four elsewhere in the Portland Metro Area, and one each in Eugene, Salem and Newport. The company also has a mail-order catalog and an e-commerce website where it sells goods from more than 2,000 Oregon manufacturers and artisans. Products sold include food, clothing, jewelry, and arts and crafts.

"Made in Oregon" sign

From 1997 until 2010, a lighted neon-and-bulb sign located atop the White Stag Building at 70 NW Couch Street in downtown Portland, facing the Burnside Bridge, advertised the company.  In place since the 1940s, the sign is one of the identifying landmarks of Portland and was designated a City of Portland Historic Landmark in 1977. During the Christmas season, the nose of the deer glows red in imitation of Rudolph the Red-Nosed Reindeer. The sign was leased from Ramsay Signs by Made in Oregon owner H. Naito Corp. (formerly Norcrest China Co.).  In 1996, Bob Naito, then vice president of H. Naito Corp., said the company had offered to buy the sign, but that Ramsay Signs was "unwilling to sell it."

In September 2010, ownership of the sign passed from Ramsay to the City of Portland, and in November the wording was changed from "Made in Oregon" to "Portland Oregon".

See also
 List of companies based in Oregon

References

External links
Made in Oregon (official website)

Companies based in Portland, Oregon
Retail companies established in 1975
Privately held companies based in Oregon
1975 establishments in Oregon